Quartus de Wet (10 March 1899 – 18 December 1980) was a South African judge who served as Judge President of the Transvaal Provincial Division of the Supreme Court of South Africa.

Early life and education
Born in 1899 in Pretoria, he was the son of Nicolaas Jacobus de Wet, Chief Justice of South Africa and acting Governor-General, and Ella Scheepers (his first wife), who is reputed to have composed the popular Afrikaans song Sarie Marais during the Anglo-Boer War. De Wet matriculated at Pretoria Boys' High School and attended the Transvaal University College and University of Cape Town, where he graduated with BA and LLB degrees.

Career
In 1922, De Wet was admitted as an advocate (the South African equivalent of a barrister) to the bar of Pretoria and after twenty three years in practice, in 1945, he took silk. He became a judge of the Transvaal Provincial Division in 1950, and he became the Judge President in 1961.

He is famous for presiding over the 1963 Rivonia Trial of Nelson Mandela and other anti-apartheid activists. During the Rivonia Trial, de Wet sentenced Mandela and other anti-apartheid activists to life imprisonment, instead of a possible death sentence, for sabotage as a result of the trial, and he noted as he passed sentence:

De Wet retired in 1969, and died in 1980; he did not (unlike the prosecutor, Percy Yutar) live to see Mandela's release in 1990.

See also
List of Judges President of the Gauteng Division of the High Court of South Africa

References 

1899 births
1980 deaths
Afrikaner people
South African people of Dutch descent
South African judges
People from Pretoria
South African Queen's Counsel